Jogisho and Palsha massacre was a premediated massacre of 42 Bengali Hindus in the Jogisho and Palsha villages under Durgapur Upazila of Rajshahi Division in East Pakistan on 16 May, 1971 by the occupying Pakistan Army in collaboration with the Razakars during the Bangladesh Liberation War. According to sources, 42 Bengali Hindus were killed by the Pakistani Forces and the Razakars.

Background 
The villages of Jogisho and Palsha falls under Deluabari Union of Durgapur upazila of Rajshahi District in western Bangladesh. Both the villages have substantial Bengali Hindu population. In 1962, during the attacks on Hindus in Darusa village under neighbouring Paba police station, five or six Hindu households were also attacked in Jogisho village. Following the attacks, a peace committee including both Hindus and Muslims was formed to prevent attacks on the Hindus.

Events 
In early morning of 16 May 1971, six Pakistan Army vans arrived at Jogisho village, along with Razakars from neighbouring villages. On arrival of the soldiers, the Hindus of Jogisho took cover in the dense vegetation nearby. Led by a postmaster of the village Abdul Qader, the Razakars lured out the Hindu villagers of Jogisho and Palsha from their hiding spots. They then brought all the hostages to the Jogisho Primary School, and separated the Hindus from the Muslims.

The soldiers then took the 42 Hindus away to a nearby remote hut and then hit them with their gunstocks, later killing them with their machine guns. Those who survived the bullets and moved a little, were stabbed with bayonets. The soldiers and the razakars then took the remains of the bodies and buried them in a nearby pond with soil. On their way out, they also looted their empty houses and took away their valuables.

Dr. M. A Hassan, in his book Yuddha O Nari (literally 'War & Women'), has captured the testimonies of widows of Jogisho village, along with others. Many widows whose names were mentioned in the book had testified about how their husbands, their elder children, etc. were taken away by the Razakars on the pretext of a "peace committee meeting" and then handed them over to the Pakistan Army. Those who could escape from this trap had hidden themselves in nearby jungles till night fell, and then took all their valuables and migrated to India. Today, some of the widows are still now alive in the Jogisho and Palsha villages.

Aftermath 
In 1996, the Rajshahi Zila Parishad acquired around five decimals of land around the Jogisho mass grave for its maintenance and protection. The area was enclosed with a one and a half feet high low brick wall and a plaque containing the names of the victims were erected. Later, the Rajshahi Zila Parishad erected a memorial inside the enclosure, which displayed the names of the victims. Some of the remains of the victims were recovered in 2006, which yet remains to be identified and handed over to their families for their last rites. According to some reports, the widows have not been receiving their pensions from the government. 

The land acquired for the protection of Jogisho mass grave is adjacent to a piece of land owned by local Awami League leader Rustam Ali. In 2008, after being elected the Vice President of Naopara Union Awami League, he forcibly occupied the land and destroyed the commemorative plaque at the mass grave. He erected a khanqah sharif over the mass grave in the memory of Tayyab Ali of Natore and named it as Shah Sufi Hazarat Tayyab Ali Khanqah Sharif. At the khanqah sharif a religious gathering is held every Thursday night where the followers smoke ganja. After the local Bengali Hindus protested the misappropriation of the mass grave, Rustam Ali erected the commemorative plaque on the wall of the khanqah sharif building.

See also 
 Bagbati massacre
 Demra massacre
 Karai Kadipur massacre
 Gopalpur massacre

References 

1971 Bangladesh genocide
Massacres of Bengali Hindus in East Pakistan
Massacres of men
Persecution of Hindus
Persecution by Muslims
1971 in Bangladesh
Massacres in 1971
Massacres committed by Pakistan in East Pakistan
May 1971 events in Bangladesh
Violence against men in Asia